The Mondriaan House (Dutch: Het Mondriaanhuis, Museum voor Constructieve en Concrete Kunst) is a museum in Amersfoort, the Netherlands, in the house where Piet Mondriaan was born in 1872. The museum lies in the historical centre of Amersfoort. The building of the Christian primary school, where the father of Mondriaan was headmaster, has also been incorporated in the museum building. In 1994, the house and the school were opened as a library and documentation centre. Since 2001 the Mondriaan House has been the only museum for constructive and concrete art in the Netherlands.

References 

 Official website

Art museums and galleries in the Netherlands
Museums in Amersfoort
Rijksmonuments in Amersfoort
Modern art museums
Art museums established in 1994
Biographical museums in the Netherlands
1994 establishments in the Netherlands
Piet Mondrian
Museums devoted to one artist
20th-century architecture in the Netherlands